Crisis loans were a feature of the social security system in the United Kingdom. They were part of the Social Fund and were abolished by the Welfare Reform Act 2012.

Social Fund (UK)